The Columbia City Hall, in Columbia, South Carolina, also known as Old United States Court House and Post Office, was built in 1870. It was listed on the National Register of Historic Places in 1973.  It includes Renaissance architecture.  It served historically as a courthouse and as a post office.

It was designed by Alfred B. Mullett.

References

.

National Register of Historic Places in Columbia, South Carolina
Renaissance Revival architecture in South Carolina
Government buildings completed in 1870
Post office buildings in South Carolina
Courthouses in South Carolina
Buildings and structures in Columbia, South Carolina
City and town halls on the National Register of Historic Places in South Carolina
Post office buildings on the National Register of Historic Places in South Carolina
Courthouses on the National Register of Historic Places in South Carolina
City and town halls in South Carolina